WIXOSS is a Japanese multimedia franchise produced as a collaboration between Takara Tomy, J.C.Staff, and Warner Bros. Entertainment Japan. The franchise revolves around the eponymous trading card game and follows girls known as Selectors who battle against each other in order to have their wishes granted. The trading card game by Takara Tomy launched in Japan in April 2014 and will begin release in English by Tomy International in November 2021. 

An anime television series by J.C.Staff, titled selector infected WIXOSS, aired in Japan between April and June 2014, with a second season, selector spread WIXOSS, airing between October and December 2014. A compilation film, titled selector destructed WIXOSS, was released on February 13, 2016. A sequel anime television series, titled Lostorage incited WIXOSS, aired from October to December 2016, with its second season, Lostorage conflated WIXOSS, airing from April to June 2018. Another anime television series, titled WIXOSS Diva(A)Live, aired from January to March 2021. Several manga spin-offs, a novelisation, and a smartphone app have also been produced.

Premise

Selectors are given the chance to have any wish granted by winning battles against other Selectors, but should they lose three times, their wish will be reversed into a curse instead.

The main selector anime series follows a girl named Ruko Kominato, who becomes a Selector after receiving an LRIG that she names Tama. As she and various other Selectors battle it out for the sake of their wish, Ruko finds herself drawn into the dark, sinister world of WIXOSS, discovering that, win or lose, there is always a price to pay.

In the Lostorage, set following the events of selector, Suzuko Homura, a girl who had just returned to her hometown, finds herself drawn into new kind of Selector battle alongside her LRIG Riru. In these battles, which now include male Selectors, players must wager coins representing their memories, and should they lose them all, they will lose all of their memories and effectively disappear.

In WIXOSS Diva(A)Live, which is set in a different universe from the previous two series, WIXOSS battles take place in a virtual world, in which players become Divas and battle in teams of three against other Divas. Hirana Asu forms the team No Limit alongside Rei Sakigake and Akino Onko and aspires to rise to the ranks of Top Diva.

Media

Anime

selector infected WIXOSS, produced by J.C.Staff, is directed by Takuya Satō and written by Mari Okada, with character designs by Kyuta Sakai and music by Maiko Iuchi of I've Sound. The first season aired on MBS between April 3 and June 19, 2014, and was simulcast by Funimation in North America and Crunchyroll in other territories outside Japan. A second season, title selector spread WIXOSS aired between in October 4 and December 20, 2014. An animated film, selector destructed WIXOSS, was released in Japanese theaters by Warner Bros. Pictures on February 13, 2016.

A new anime project featuring new characters, titled Lostorage incited WIXOSS, aired from October 7 to December 23, 2016, and was simulcast by Crunchyroll. Katsushi Sakurabi is directing the new anime, with Michihiro Tsuchiya writing the scripts, Takamitsu Satou designing the characters, Maiko Iuchi composing the music, and J.C.Staff returning to produce the animation. The opening theme is "Lostorage" by Yuka Iguchi while the ending theme is "undeletable" by Cyua. Another season, Lostorage conflated WIXOSS aired from April 6 to June 22, 2018. The first episode was released as an original video animation bundled with the SP-32 Selector Collection trading card set on December 14, 2017. The opening theme is "Unlock" by Iguchi while the ending theme is "I" by Cyua.

A new television series was announced on March 26, 2020, which was originally set to premiere in 2020. Titled WIXOSS Diva(A)Live, it aired from January 9 to March 27, 2021. Masato Matsune is directing the new anime, with Gō Tamai writing the scripts, Ui Shigure designing the characters, Maiko Iuchi composing the music, and J.C.Staff returning to produce the animation. Crunchyroll licensed the series.

Manga
Four manga spin-off series, written by Okada, are being produced. selector infected WIXOSS -peeping analyze-, illustrated by Manatsu Suzuki, was serialized in Shueisha's Ultra Jump magazine between July 19, 2014, and May 19, 2015. , illustrated by Nini, began serialization in Ultra Jump from August 2014. selector infected WIXOSS -Re/Verse-, illustrated by Meki Meki, was serialized in Square Enix's Monthly Big Gangan magazine between August 25, 2014 and October 24, 2015. selector stirred WIXOSS, illustrated by Monaco Sena, began publication in Hobby Japan's WIXOSS Magazine from April 25, 2015.

Trading Card Game
A card game titled "WIXOSS" by Takara Tomy has started on April 26, 2014. On July 13, 2021, Tomy International announced that an English version of the game would begin release from November 2021, beginning with the Interlude Diva set based on the WIXOSS Diva(A)Live anime series. Interlude Diva set Released November 6, 2021. Diva Debut Decks and Glowing Diva set released December 17, 2021. Changing Diva set WxDi P02 releases March 18, 2022.

Other media
A novel written by Madoka Madoka and illustrated by Meiji, titled WIXOSS: Twin Wing, was released in Japan on September 30, 2015. A smartphone game, selector battle with WIXOSS, was released in Japan for Android and iOS on March 31, 2015, and June 8, 2015, respectively.

Notes

References

External links
Anime official website 
Lostorage incited WIXOSS anime official website 
WIXOSS Diva(A)Live anime official website 
Trading card game official website 

How to Play Wixoss Trading Card Game in English at The Anime Blog

2014 manga
2021 anime television series debuts
Anime with original screenplays
Card games in anime and manga
Crunchyroll anime
Dark fantasy anime and manga
Fiction about body swapping
Films with screenplays by Mari Okada
Gangan Comics manga
Hobby Japan manga
J.C.Staff
Magical girl anime and manga
Mainichi Broadcasting System original programming
Psychological thriller anime and manga
Science fiction anime and manga
Seinen manga
Shueisha manga
Television shows written by Mari Okada
Tokyo MX original programming
Warner Entertainment Japan franchises